Winter Hours may refer to:
 Winter Hours, an album by American metal band Tombs
 Winter Hours, an alternative rock band from New Jersey